Noel Arambulet (born May 18, 1974 in Falcón, Venezuela) is a minimum straw weight boxer.

Professional career 
Nicknamed "El Verdugo", Arambulet turned pro in 1996 and captured the vacant WBA minimumweight title with a decision win over Joma Gamboa in 1999. He defended the belt once before being stripped of the title for not making weight for a rematch against Gamboa in 2000. Gamboa won the fight and the title. He recaptured the WBA minimumweight title with a close decision win over Keitaro Hoshino in 2002. He defended the belt twice before losing it to Yutaka Niida in 2004 by decision, although, officially the title was stripped due to his failure to make weight.

Professional boxing record

See also 
 List of WBA world champions

References

External links 
 

1974 births
People from Falcón
Light-flyweight boxers
Living people
Venezuelan male boxers
Mini-flyweight boxers
World mini-flyweight boxing champions
World Boxing Association champions